Hilary Caldwell (born March 13, 1991) is a Canadian competition swimmer who trains in Victoria, British Columbia. She won a bronze medal in the 200 m backstroke at the 2016 Summer Olympics in Rio de Janeiro. Caldwell won a bronze medal in the same event at the 2013 World Aquatics Championships, as well as a bronze at the 2014 Commonwealth Games in the 200 m backstroke. She won a gold in the 200 m backstroke at the 2015 Pan American Games in Toronto.

Career
She first started competitive swimming in South Surrey near White Rock, British Columbia.

At the 2012 Summer Olympics in London, she competed in the women's 200-metre backstroke, finishing in 18th place overall in the heats, failing to qualify for the semi-finals.  The next season at the 2013 World Aquatics Championships Caldwell swam to a surprise bronze medal in the 200-metre backstroke.  She set and broke the national record for the 200-metre backstroke in each of the qualifying, semi-final, and final rounds in the process. This broke teammate Sinead Russell's record who finished seventh in the same event.

Caldwell had teamed up with noted West Coast coach Randy Bennett in Victoria during 2009, he also coached Canadian Olympic medallist Ryan Cochrane.  This move was credited for her successful upturn and focus on the backstroke while being previously looked at as a competitor in the individual medley.

She continued to perform well under the tutelage of Bennett, Caldwell next swam to a bronze medal at the 2014 Commonwealth Games in her feature event, the 200 m backstroke. She also swam in the 50 and 100 m backstroke.  The next year, she followed that up with a gold medal at the 2015 Pan American Games in Toronto. The win was an emotional one has it came just months after the death of her esteemed coach, Bennett, who helped propel her to such heights.

For the 2016 Summer Olympics, Caldwell was named to Canada's Olympic team. In the 200 m metre backstroke event, Caldwell swam to a bronze medal. After the event she told CBC reporters that the previous year was hard and she wanted to make her new coach Ryan Mallette proud.

In September 2017, Caldwell was named to Canada's 2018 Commonwealth Games team.

Caldwell had a supporting acting role in the forthcoming film Nadia, Butterfly.

See also
List of World Aquatics Championships medalists in swimming (women)

References

External links
 
 
 
 
 
 
 

1991 births
Living people
Canadian female backstroke swimmers
Olympic swimmers of Canada
Swimmers at the 2012 Summer Olympics
Swimmers at the 2014 Commonwealth Games
Swimmers at the 2015 Pan American Games
World Aquatics Championships medalists in swimming
Commonwealth Games bronze medallists for Canada
Pan American Games gold medalists for Canada
Swimmers at the 2016 Summer Olympics
Medalists at the 2016 Summer Olympics
Medalists at the FINA World Swimming Championships (25 m)
Olympic bronze medalists for Canada
Olympic bronze medalists in swimming
Swimmers from London, Ontario
Commonwealth Games medallists in swimming
Pan American Games medalists in swimming
Universiade medalists in swimming
Swimmers at the 2018 Commonwealth Games
Universiade silver medalists for Canada
Medalists at the 2011 Summer Universiade
Medalists at the 2015 Pan American Games
Medallists at the 2014 Commonwealth Games